Barbara A. Granlund (July 7, 1928 – November 14, 2020) was an American politician in the state of Washington. Granlund served in the Washington House of Representatives from 1979 to 1983 and in the Washington State Senate from 1983 to 1985 as a Democrat from the 27th District.

She died on November 14, 2020, in Tacoma, Washington at age 92.

References

1928 births
2020 deaths
People from Holdrege, Nebraska
Women state legislators in Washington (state)
Democratic Party Washington (state) state senators
Democratic Party members of the Washington House of Representatives
21st-century American women